The Dori, also called the Lora and Kadanai, is a river of Afghanistan and Pakistan.

The Dori begins north of the city of Quetta. It is called Lora in its headwaters in Pakistan. The name changes to Kadanai upon its entry into Afghanistan, and the name Dori is given below the town of Spin Baldak.

In Afghanistan, Dori first runs westward and soon faces the sandy desert of Rigestan. It then takes a northerly direction and along the desert passes east and northeast past Takht-e Pol, bordering southeast of the Kandahar Valley.

Hydrology 
The Dori receives most of its flow from melting snow in spring, especially in March.

Irrigation greatly reduces its speed.

References

External links
"Map of the Pishin Valley and Upper Basin of the Lora: Constructed from the Surveys and Reconnaissances Executed by Officers Attached to the Forces Serving in Southern Afghanistan, Collated with Major Wilson's Map by W. J. Turner" is from 1880

Rivers of Afghanistan
Rivers of Balochistan (Pakistan)
Balochistan
International rivers of Asia
Helmand River drainage basin
Landforms of Kandahar Province
Rivers of Pakistan